The Town Museum of Karol Točík in Turzovka (Slovakia) is dedicated to Karol Točík, who was priest and dean in Turzovka, and also regional historian. He worked in Turzovka between 1917 and 1959. Karol Točík (* 1890, Ústie nad Oravou – † 1960, Žilina), was during his life studied the history of Turzovka and the upper Kysuce region. He wrote several historical works prepared for printing, but due to the change in political system in Czechoslovakia in 1948, have never been published.

History 
The Town Museum in Turzovka was established on October 1, 2015. The opening ceremony of the museum, the first institution of this type in Turzovka, was on August 12, 2016. The first exhibition was dedicated to the "Father's Heritage" and was composed of a selection of exhibits donated by the local institutions and citizens of Turzovka. Slovak Post issued official postal product on this occasion – postmark (issue number PPP 41/16). The most precious exhibit of the museum is the original bell, which for Turzovka was donated by its founder, Palatine Juraj Turzo in 1614. This bell in stylized appearance is also appeared in the Museum logo.

External links 
 Virtual tour of the museum in 2016 – "Father's Heritage"

References 

Museums in Žilina Region
History museums in Slovakia
Tourist attractions in Žilina Region